TouchFire is a physical iPad keyboard designed by two Seattle-based inventors, Steve Isaac and Brad Melmon. The company was financed via the crowd-funding website, Kickstarter, and raised $201,400 in two months. The keyboard gained notoriety because of its construction from transparent silicone with magnets that sticks onto an iPad's on-screen keyboard. In 2013, TouchFire was listed as one of the “100 Brilliant Companies” by Entrepreneur magazine.

See also
iPad
Kickstarter

References

Computer keyboard models